The Koiso Cabinet is the 41st Cabinet of Japan led by Kuniaki Koiso from July 22, 1944, to April 7, 1945.

Cabinet

References 

Cabinet of Japan
1944 establishments in Japan
Cabinets established in 1944
Cabinets disestablished in 1945